The fourth series of Dancing on Ice aired from 11 January to 22 March 2009 on ITV. Phillip Schofield and Holly Willoughby returned as main presenters, while Karen Barber, Nicky Slater, Jason Gardiner, Ruthie Henshall and Robin Cousins returned to the "Ice Panel".

The final took place on Sunday 22 March 2009 and was won by Ray Quinn.

Judges and Hosts 

It was announced that Nicky Slater, Jason Gardiner, Ruthie Henshall, Karen Barber and Robin Cousins would all return for the fourth series, and Holly Willoughby and Phillip Schofield returned as hosts while Jayne Torvill and Christopher Dean returned to train.

Couples
The line-up was revealed on 5 January 2009 with thirteen couples competing, including Michael Underwood, who returned to compete after pulling out the previous year due to injury. The celebrities and their partners were:

Scoring chart 

Green scores indicate the highest skating score of the week.
Red scores indicate the lowest skating score of the week.
 indicates the couple eliminated that week
 indicates the returning couple that were saved from the Skate-off
 indicates the winning couple
 indicates the runner-up couple
 indicates the third-place couple
"—" indicates the couple that did not skate that week

Average score chart 
This table only counts for dances scored on a traditional 30-point scale.

Live show details

Results summary
Colour key

Week 1 (11 January 2009)
Required element: None
Note: Only the couples with male celebrities skated this week

Judges' votes to save
Barber: Donal & Florentine
Slater: Donal & Florentine
Gardiner: Donal & Florentine
Henshall: Donal & Florentine
Cousins: Donal & Florentine

Week 2 (18 January 2009)
 Required element: None
 Note: Only couples with female celebrities skated this week

Judges' votes to save
Barber: Melinda & Fred
Slater: Melinda & Fred
Gardiner: Melinda & Fred
Henshall: Melinda & Fred
Cousins: Melinda & Fred

Week 3 (25 January 2009)
Required element: Toe Step Sequence

Judges' votes to save
Barber: Ellery & Frankie
Slater: Ellery & Frankie
Gardiner: Ellery & Frankie
Henshall: Ellery & Frankie
Cousins: Ellery & Frankie

Week 4 (1 February 2009)
Required element: Pairs spiral

Judges' votes to save
Barber: Michael & Melanie
Slater: Michael & Melanie
Gardiner: Melinda & Fred
Henshall: Melinda & Fred
Cousins: Melinda & Fred

Week 5 (8 February 2009)
Required element: Change of Edge

Judges' votes to save
Barber: Ellery and Frankie
Slater: Ellery and Frankie
Gardiner: Ellery and Frankie
Henshall: Todd and Susie
Cousins: Ellery and Frankie

Week 6 (15 February 2009)
Required element: Shadow Spin
Theme: 80's Night

Judges' votes to save
Barber: Melinda & Fred
Slater: Ellery & Frankie
Gardiner: Melinda & Fred
Henshall: Melinda & Fred
Cousins: Melinda & Fred

Week 7 (22 February 2009)
Required element: Step sequence (spiral, lunge, cross roll and one-footed stop)

Judges' votes to save
Barber: Jessica & Pavel
Slater: Jessica & Pavel
Gardiner: Jessica & Pavel
Henshall: Jessica & Pavel
Cousins: Jessica & Pavel

Week 8 (1 March 2009)
 Theme: Prop's Week

Judges' votes to save
Barber: Zöe & Matt
Slater: Zöe & Matt
Gardiner: Zöe & Matt
Henshall: Zöe & Matt
Cousins: Zöe & Matt

Week 9 (8 March 2009)
Required element: Unassisted jump

Judges' votes to save
Barber: Jessica & Pavel
Slater: Jessica & Pavel
Gardiner: Jessica & Pavel
Henshall: Zöe & Matt
Cousins: Jessica & Pavel

Week 10: Semi-Final (15 March 2009)
Required element: 20 second solo dance

Judges' votes to save
Barber: Donal & Florentine
Slater: Donal & Florentine  
Gardiner: Donal & Florentine
Henshall: Donal & Florentine
Cousins: Donal & Florentine

Week 11: Finale (22 March 2009)
 Required element: Flying

After Round 1, voting lines opened and votes were cast during the second performances. Lines soon closed and third place was announced, meaning they would not be performing Bolero, even though they had practised it all week.

Required elements 
 Week 1: None
 Week 2: None
 Week 3: Toe step sequence
 Week 4: Pairs spiral
 Week 5: Change of edge
 Week 6: Shadow spin
 Week 7: Step sequence (spiral, lunge, cross roll and one-footed stop)
 Week 8: Use of a prop
 Week 9: Unassisted jump
 Week 10: 20-second solo dance
 Week 11: Flying/Bolero

Ratings

References 

Series 04
2009 British television seasons